The 1868 Exeter by-election was held on 21 December 1868.  The by-election was held due to the incumbent Liberal MP, John Coleridge, becoming Solicitor General for England and Wales.  It was retained by Coleridge who was unopposed.

References

1868 elections in the United Kingdom
1868 in England
19th century in Exeter
Elections in Exeter
By-elections to the Parliament of the United Kingdom in Devon constituencies
Unopposed ministerial by-elections to the Parliament of the United Kingdom in English constituencies
December 1868 events